The Grand Hyatt San Antonio is a 34-story, 1,003 room hotel in Downtown San Antonio, Texas, built in 2008. It is the tallest building constructed in the city during the 2000s, the second tallest hotel in the city, and the third tallest skyscraper overall in the city.

The building was designed by the firms Arquitectonica and Kell Munoz Architects, and is mixed residential/commercial (hotel) use.

See also 
 List of tallest buildings in San Antonio

References

External links

Skyscraper hotels in San Antonio
Hyatt Hotels and Resorts
Hotel buildings completed in 2008
Arquitectonica buildings